Vincenzo Soprano is an Italian manager and CEO of Trenitalia since 2006.

Life and career
He was born in Rome on 5 October 1957, he graduated in 1981 and he has three sons. He worked at ENI company and in Gaz de France company. He has been CEO of Trenitalia until the end of 2015.

Criticism
In 2014, during an interview with the former Italian Minister Luca Zaia, Zaia said that the Trenitalia trains are like cattle cars and that they are always late and that Vincenzo Soprano is not the right person intended to manage a company like the branch of the Ferrovie dello Stato Italiane Spa, Trenitalia.

Legal problems
He is currently under investigation for the violation of security measures that caused Trenitalia train accidents in 2013.

References

External links
Trenitalia.com

Italian chief executives
1957 births
Living people